Eleanor Rigby is a 2004 novel by Douglas Coupland, about a lonely woman at ages 36 and 42. The novel is written as a first-person narrative by the main character, Liz Dunn. Its title is derived from the 1966 song of the same name by the Beatles.

The novel centres on changes to Liz's life when someone from her past unexpectedly re-enters her life.  It is written in a light, often comic, tone, but  resonates on many deeper issues, including loneliness, family, religious visions and multiple sclerosis.

Plot
Two distinct plot movements are separated by a break in the narrative flow. The first part of the novel involves two retellings: the story of Liz Dunn’s trip to Europe and her pregnancy, and the story of the re-emergence into her life of her child, Jeremy, who is dying of multiple sclerosis.

As a teenager, Liz goes on a trip to Europe, her one big expressive moment. On this trip, while drunk, she loses her virginity in Italy to a man she cannot remember. From this experience, she becomes pregnant with Jeremy, who is put up for adoption, and goes in and out of foster families for much of his young life.

Jeremy arrives back into Liz’s life when she is at a low point of loneliness. His illness is terminal, and because of drug abuse, he has only a short time to live. Jeremy’s introduction into Liz’s life rattles the lonely world she has constructed, opening up her and her world.

The first part of the novel, narrated by Liz, jumps between these two moments, constantly reminding the reader that these are moments in the past. There is a symbolic page break between the first section, which takes place in the past, and the second section, which takes place in the novel’s present.

In the present, Jeremy has died. Liz finds a meteorite that she takes to be a very precious object. She sleeps with it under her pillow to keep it close.  She eventually, through a list of circumstances, decides to travel to Europe to find Jeremy’s father, a trip which again leads her to a world of excitement, police and army incidents, and a reunion with Jeremy’s father.

Characters

Liz Dunn
Liz Dunn is the protagonist of this novel. She is an overweight, lonely woman, who lives a removed solitary existence. Her apartment, for instance, can only accommodate one person.

Coupland has spoken extensively about the character of Liz Dunn, claiming that she was his most realistic character.

Jeremy
Liz’s son Jeremy, who was sent out for adoption, has a terminal case of multiple sclerosis. He has traveled through the foster-care system of British Columbia, residing with many families who abused him. He eventually reconnects with Liz after finding her and registers her as his next of kin for emergencies. When he is hospitalized, Liz reconnects with her son.

Jeremy is cheerful in the face of his condition, happy with the life that he has left to lead. He eventually becomes a successful mattress salesman in the time leading up to his death. He experiences visions of a post-apocalyptic future, which enthralls Liz. He envisions a future where crops have gone foul and farmers ask a divine voice for guidance.

Inspiration

Loneliness
The inspiration for Eleanor Rigby was loneliness. Coupland suffered through a period in his early twenties he describes as being caused by loneliness.

The title
The novel is named after the Beatles' 1966 song of the same name. The song reference was inspired from a moment in Coupland's past. Coupland heard the song "on a friend's mother's record player. And the story threw me: 'Oh my God, what happened to her?' The lyrics didn't tell you much but in my head I always saw her as an only child of very old parents who didn't have a clue and she was left in a rectory and died without leaving any mark anywhere ... The book's not like that, of course, but it's the mood and the way Liz describes herself." The song itself features in the narrative as it is Liz Dunn's email address.

References

External links
 Book review from The Guardian
 Book review from The New York Times

2004 Canadian novels
Novels by Douglas Coupland
Novels set in Vancouver
Bloomsbury Publishing books